Mohammad Qoli-ye Sofla (also Romanized as Moḩammad Qolī-ye Soflá; also known as Moḩammadqolī) is a village in Chahar Gonbad Rural District, in the Central District of Sirjan County, Kerman Province, Iran. At the 2021 census, its population was 12350000.<ref>

References 

Populated places in Sirjan County